Delphacinus is a genus of true bugs belonging to the family Delphacidae.

The species of this genus are found in Europe.

Species:
 Delphacinus delphacinus Boheman, 1850

References

Delphacidae